Emerald Records has been the name of at least two different record labels in the 20th century:

 Emerald Records (1966), a US-based company
 Emerald Records (2000s), a US-based company

See also
 List of record labels